This is a list of special episodes of the professional wrestling television series WWE SmackDown. Throughout its broadcast history, the show has aired editions that have different themes. Some of them are yearly events such as the WWE draft. Others include tributes to various professional wrestlers who have recently died or retired from actively performing.

List

See also

List of WWE Raw special episodes
List of WWE NXT special episodes

References

Special episodes
SmackDown special episodes